The Ridiculously Self-Indulgent, Ill-Advised Vanity Tour was a concert tour performed by American musician and satirist "Weird Al" Yankovic. Intended to be a more intimate and less stylized production compared to his previous concert tours, the Vanity Tour focused on Yankovic's older material and original songs. The 76-date North American tour was announced in October 2017, and included 68 shows in the United States and eight shows in Canada. Following the conclusion of the tour, recordings of the entire tour were released on Stitcher Premium.

Background
In a departure from his previous concert tours, Yankovic set out on The Ridiculously Self-Indulgent, Ill-Advised Vanity Tour with the intention to produce a more intimate, less stylized show than his preceding concert tours, describing the Vanity Tour as having an "extremely limited appeal" by design, and inspired by the staging of VH1 Storytellers and MTV Unplugged. The absence of video screens and advanced lighting, along with the Vanity Tour's lack of his popular hits, costumes changes, props, and choreography present in Yankovic's previous tours allowed for a more flexible and unpredictable experience, to the testimonial approval of Yankovic himself and his touring band. In the tour's October 2017 announcement across social media, Yankovic stated:

The opening act was the comedian Emo Philips, who had previously worked with Yankovic in his 1989 movie UHF and 1997 TV series The Weird Al Show.

In accordance with Yankovic's desired theme of more intimate and "loose" shows, the setlist for The Ridiculously Self-Indulgent, Ill-Advised Vanity Tour was different every night, with an (ill-advised) focus on older material and original songs from his discography, as opposed to his staple parody songs. Yankovic performed a straight cover version of a different classic rock song during the encore of each show.

Promotion
The Ridiculously Self-Indulgent, Ill-Advised Vanity Tour was officially announced on "Weird Al" Yankovic's official social media pages on 13 October 2017, with information on tour dates, venues and ticket sales appearing on Yankovic's official website the day after. Tickets for the Vanity Tour, which went on sale on October 20, were advertised from $50 to $70. The tour's announcement also coincided with the November 2017 release of Squeeze Box and Medium Rarities, two compilation albums collecting the works of Yankovic.

Follow-up tour 

In 2021 "Weird Al" Yankovic announced a follow-up concert tour to the Ridiculously Self-Indulgent, Ill-Advised Vanity Tour "The Unfortunate Return of the Ridiculously Self-Indulgent, Ill-Advised Vanity Tour", set to be performed from May to October 2022 which will have special guest Emo Phillips.

Setlist
Each of the 77 shows had a different set list, with the following 51 songs in regular rotation:

"Airline Amy"  
"Albuquerque"
"The Biggest Ball of Twine in Minnesota"
"Bob"
"Buy Me a Condo"
"Christmas at Ground Zero"
"Close But No Cigar"
"CNR"
"Craigslist"
"Dare to Be Stupid" (Grateful Dead version)
"Dog Eat Dog"
"Don’t Download This Song"
"Fun Zone"
"Generic Blues"
"Good Enough For Now"
"Good Old Days"
"Happy Birthday"
"I Remember Larry"
"I Was Only Kidding"
"I’ll Sue Ya"
"I'm So Sick of You"
"If That Isn’t Love"
"Jackson Park Express"
"Let Me Be Your Hog"
"Melanie"
"Midnight Star"
"Mr. Frump in the Iron Lung"
"Mr. Popeil"
"My Baby’s in Love With Eddie Vedder"
"My Own Eyes"
"Nature Trail to Hell"
"The Night Santa Went Crazy"
"One More Minute"
"One of Those Days"
"Party at the Leper Colony"
"The Saga Begins"
"She Never Told Me She Was a Mime"
"Stop Forwarding That Crap to Me"
"Stuck in a Closet With Vanna White"
"That Boy Could Dance"
"Traffic Jam"
"Truck Drivin' Song"
"UHF"
"Velvet Elvis"
"When I Was Your Age"
"Why Does This Always Happen to Me?"
"Yoda"
"You Don’t Love Me Anymore"
"Young, Dumb & Ugly"
"Your Horoscope For Today"
Unplugged Medley ("Eat It", "I Lost on Jeopardy", "Amish Paradise", "Smells Like Nirvana", "White & Nerdy", "I Love Rocky Road", "Like a Surgeon")

Tour dates

Festivals and other miscellaneous performances
This concert was a part of the "Nashville Comedy Festival"
This concert was a part of the "Moontower Comedy Festival"

Box office score data

References

External links

"Weird Al" Yankovic's official website

2018 concert tours
Concert tours of North America
"Weird Al" Yankovic concert tours